Chief Mountain is an unincorporated community in southern Alberta in Improvement District No. 4, on Highway 6,  southwest of Lethbridge. It serves as a port of entry into the U.S. state of Montana.

See also 
 Chief Mountain Border Crossing

References 

Alberta land ports of entry
Waterton Lakes National Park